George Kerr McNaughton (July 4, 1877 – September 15, 1951) was a Canadian politician. He served in the Legislative Assembly of British Columbia from 1928 to 1933  from the electoral district of Comox, as a Conservative. He was a doctor.

References

British Columbia Conservative Party MLAs
1877 births
1951 deaths